Cyriacus (4th century) or Cyriac, was a Roman nobleman and Christian martyr under Diocletian.

Cyriacus, Quiricus, or variations, may also refer to:

Cyriacus of Jerusalem (2nd century), bishop and saint
Cyriacus of Alexandria (3rd century), two martyrs, saints, and companions of Faustus, Abibus and Dionysius of Alexandria
Cyriacus I of Byzantium (3rd century), bishop of Byzantium
Quiriacus of Ostia (3rd century), Bishop of Ostia, Christian martyr and saint
Judas Cyriacus (4th century), also known as Cyriacus of Ancona, a saint, martyr, and patron saint of Ancona, Italy
Pope Cyriacus (probably 4th century), unknown in the pontifical records but referenced in the legend of Saint Ursula
Quiricus (4th century), a child martyr; see Quiricus and Julietta
Cyriacus the Anchorite (5th century), a Greek monk and saint
Cyriacus II of Constantinople (7th century), Ecumenical Patriarch of Constantinople
Quiricus, Bishop of Barcelona (7th century), may be identical to Quiricus, Bishop of Toledo
Quiricus, Bishop of Toledo (7th century), may be identical to Bishop Quiricus of Barcelona
Quriaqos of Tagrit (8th–9th century), Syriac Orthodox Patriarch of Antioch
Cyriacus of Carthage (11th century), archbishop of Carthage
Kirakos Gandzaketsi or Cyriacus of Gandzak (1200–1271), an Armenian historian
Cyriacus of Ancona or Ciriaco de' Pizzicolli (15th century), traveller and antiquarian in the Aegean
Cyriak or Cyriak Harris (21st century), an English freelance animator

Other uses
Saint Cyriakus, Gernrode, a medieval church in Gernrode, Saxony-Anhalt, Germany

See also
Kyriakos
 Kuriakose